Yushancun Cable Car is an aerial tramway that allows people in the isolated village of Yushan to cross the deep Loushui River Gorge to access route X038 in a remote region of Hubei, China.  The 650 meter span crosses 350 meters above the Loushui River making it the second highest tramway in China after the Gulucun Cable Car.

In later years the static 2 support cable configuration was improved with the addition of a 3rd cable.  The small 4-person gondola is pulled along by a 4th cable powered by a diesel engine inside the east station.

Gallery

References

 News story on Yushancun Tramway history
 Sohu Webpage on Yushancun Tramway

Transport in China
Aerial tramways